Rajon Das is a Bangladeshi architect. He was born in 1978, Sylhet. He received his Bachelor in Architecture from BUET in 2006 and started his own architectural firm known as Kshiti Sthapati in 2005. Das is known for his regional style of architecture and conservation in historic buildings. He is an assistant professor in the Department of Architecture at Leading University.

Selected works
 Wondaal, an Indian-bangla Restaurant, at Zindabazar, Sylhet, Bangladesh
 Sylhet Club at Barshala, Airport Road,  Sylhet, Bangladesh
 Big Fish, an Indian-bangla Restaurant, at Noyasarak, Sylhet, Bangladesh
 Sylhet Govt. College Independence Monument
 Dristipat, Language Monument at Modon Mohan College
 Conservation,  Khan Bahadur Ahia Villa (Jitu Miah's Villa), at Sheikh Ghat, Sylhet, Bangladesh
 Town Square (nagari chattar), Sylhet, Bangladesh

Publications
 "Religious Philosophy, Architectural Elements, and Local Context – A Close observation in Kantajee Temple, Bangladesh", Research Journal 2005, Department of Architecture and Planning, NED University of Engineering and Technology, Maulana  Din Mohammad Wafai Road, Karachi-74200, Pakistan.

Awards
 ICE Today-Aqua Paints, Non Residential design (Best restaurant); 2009

References

Bangladeshi architects
Living people
Modernist architects
21st-century Bangladeshi architects
1978 births